The Semayawi Party or Blue Party was an Ethiopian political party established in 2012. The party operates throughout the country. Its ideology was liberalism and was uniquely fond of conservative and nationalist views and promotes individualism. In May 2019, the Blue Party was brought to an end when it merged with the Ethiopian Citizens for Social Justice.

References

External links
Official website

2012 establishments in Ethiopia
2019 disestablishments in Ethiopia
Conservative parties in Africa
Defunct political parties in Ethiopia
Ethiopian nationalism
Liberal parties in Ethiopia
Nationalist parties in Africa
Political parties disestablished in 2019
Political parties established in 2012